The 2013 FIM Superstock 1000 Cup was the fifteenth season of the FIM Superstock 1000 Cup, the ninth held under this name. It began on 7 April at Aragón and finished on 20 October in Jerez after 9 rounds. Sylvain Barrier returned on the BMW he won the title with in 2012. The first few rounds were hotly contested between Barrier, Eddi La Marra and his teammate and former Superstock 1000 champion Niccolò Canepa. Unfortunately for La Marra, he would have a massive accident during testing which left him with in a coma and unable to complete the final three rounds of the championship on his Ducati Panigale. Barrier won 5 of the 9 races to retain his championship title, doing so at his home event at Magny-Cours. Despite skipping the final round at Jerez – to compete in the Superbike World Championship event – Barrier beat Canepa to the title by 24 points, with Jérémy Guarnoni a further point behind in third place.

Race calendar
The provisional race schedule was publicly announced by the FIM on 6 October 2012 with nine confirmed rounds and one other round pending confirmation. On 8 March 2013, the FIM issued a definitive calendar, confirming rounds at Portimão and Imola that were previously subject to contract, as well as reducing the number of venues from ten to nine, but a second race was later added to the schedule of the Silverstone round. The series supported the Superbike World Championship at every meeting except Phillip Island, Donington Park, Moscow Raceway, Istanbul Park and Laguna Seca.

Championship standings

Riders' championship

Manufacturers' championship

Entry list

All entries used Pirelli tyres.

References

External links
Official website

Superstock 1000
FIM Superstock 1000 Cup seasons
FIM Superstock 1000 Cup